Zip City is a small unincorporated community in Lauderdale County in the northern part of the U.S. state of Alabama, at the intersection of Alabama Highway 17 and County Road 8. Zip City falls within the U.S. Central Time Zone. It is part of the Florence - Muscle Shoals Metropolitan Statistical Area known as "The Shoals".

History
The first non-indigenous settlement was made at Zip City in 1817. Zip City received its unusual name from the fact drivers would "zip" through town heading towards the Tennessee state line, where they could buy alcohol. The name dates from the 1920s.

In popular culture
Zip City, of late, has been popularized by the Drive-By Truckers song of the same name. The song was penned by the Truckers' co-founder, Mike Cooley, (a longtime resident of the area) in 2001. The song appeared on the Truckers' 2001 release, Southern Rock Opera.

Said the band's other co-founder, Patterson Hood, of the song:

 "Cooley wrote this one and should be the one explaining it. I do know that it is at least 90% true and is my personal favorite song on the album."

While interviewing the band in 2002, David Dye of the radio program "The World Cafe" had this to say about the song:

"People around the country call the radio stations that carry this show and say this Album (Southern Rock Opera) is their life, and "Zip City" is most certainly one I get that from."

References

External links
Satellite Image from Wikimapia
"Zip City" by Drive-By Truckers Lyrics

Unincorporated communities in Lauderdale County, Alabama
Florence–Muscle Shoals metropolitan area
Unincorporated communities in Alabama